Little Queen is the third studio album by American rock band Heart, released on May 14, 1977, by Portrait Records. The album was recorded and mixed at Kaye-Smith Studios in Seattle, Washington, from February to April 1977. On June 29, 2004, a remastered version of Little Queen was released by Epic Records and Legacy Recordings with two bonus tracks.

Background
The group intended Magazine to be the official follow-up to their debut album Dreamboat Annie. However, a contract dispute with their label, Mushroom Records, resulted in the group signing with the newly formed Portrait Records, a division of CBS Records (now Sony BMG).

The Mushroom contract called for two albums, and the label took the position that they were owed a second one. On that basis, Mushroom attempted to prevent the release of Little Queen and any other work by Heart. They took the five unfinished tracks for Magazine and added a B-side and two live recordings. The first release of the album in April 1977 included a disclaimer on the back cover.

The court eventually decided that Heart was free to sign with a new label but indeed owed Mushroom a second album. Therefore, Heart returned to the studio to re-record, remix, edit, and resequence the Magazine recordings in a marathon session over four days. A court-ordered guard stood nearby to prevent the master tapes from being erased.

Little Queen was released on May 14, 1977, and the reworked version of Magazine was re-released on April 22, 1978. With the successful single "Barracuda", Little Queen outsold Magazine handily, eventually earning a triple platinum certification from the Recording Industry Association of America (RIAA). However, the almost simultaneous 1977 releases also gave the band the distinction of having all three of their albums (Dreamboat Annie, Magazine, and Little Queen) on the charts at the same time.

"Barracuda"
After Dreamboat Annie became a million seller, Mushroom took out a full-page ad in the December 30, 1976, issue of Rolling Stone magazine touting the band's success, using the headline "Million to One Shot Sells a Million". The ad looked like the front page of the tabloid newspaper National Enquirer and included a photo from the Dreamboat Annie cover shoot. The caption read: "Heart's Wilson Sisters Confess: 'It Was Only Our First Time!'".

After this ad surfaced, a Detroit radio promoter asked Ann Wilson about her lover—referring to Nancy, thus implying that the sisters were incestuous lesbian lovers. Ann was outraged and retreated to her hotel room to write a song. When she relayed the incident to Nancy, she, too, was infuriated. Nancy joined Ann and contributed a melody and bridge. The song became "Barracuda", which peaked at number 11 on the Billboard Hot 100 and remains one of the band's signature songs.

Track listing

Personnel
Credits adapted from the liner notes of Little Queen.

Heart
 Ann Wilson – lead vocals ; flute 
 Nancy Wilson – acoustic guitar ; autoharp ; vocals ; mandolin ; piano ; electric guitar ; blues harp, lead vocals 
 Roger Fisher – lead guitar ; mandolin ; electric guitar 
 Howard Leese – lead guitar ; Mellotron ; acoustic guitar, piano ; vocals ; Moog bass ; electric guitar ; guitar ; grand piano, string arrangements, string conducting ; mandolin 
 Michael DeRosier – drums ; tabla ; percussion ; timpani, chimes 
 Steve Fossen – bass

Additional musicians
 Lynn Wilson Keagle – vocals 
 Seal Dunnington – vocals

Technical
 Mike Flicker – production, engineering
 Buzz Richmond – engineering
 Winslow Kutz – engineering
 Mike Fisher – special direction

Artwork
 Heart – cover concept
 Mike Doud – art direction
 Marilyn Romen – art direction
 John Kehe – design 
 Bob Seidemann – photography

Charts

Weekly charts

Year-end charts

Certifications

References

Bibliography

 
 

1977 albums
Albums produced by Mike Flicker
Heart (band) albums
Portrait Records albums